TRL or trl may refer to:

Arts
 Temporary Residence Limited, a record label
 Total Request Live, a former MTV show
 TRL Awards (Total Request Live), an Italian music award

Libraries
 Tampines Regional Library, a regional library in Tampines, Singapore
 Timberland Regional Library, Washington state, US

Science and technology
 Technology readiness level
 Telstra Research Laboratories, Australia
 Thru-Reflect-Line, a technique used for network analyzer (electrical) calibration
 Transistor–resistor logic, a class of digital circuits
 Transport Research Laboratory, UK

Sports
 Tariff Reform League, UK
 Toowoomba Rugby League, Australian rugby league football competition

Transportation
 Terrell Municipal Airport, Texas, US, IATA airport code TRL
 Thirroul railway station, New South Wales, Australia, station code TRL
 Tiruvallur railway station, Tamil Nadu, India, station code TRL

Other uses
 Turkish lira, ISO 4217 code before redenomination in 2005
 trl, the ISO 639-3 code for Scottish Cant, Scotland